Nyholmia is a genus of marsh beetles in the family Scirtidae. There are about five described species in Nyholmia.

Species
These five species belong to the genus Nyholmia:
 Nyholmia bicolor (LeConte, 1853)
 Nyholmia collaris (Guérin-Méneville, 1843)
 Nyholmia confusa (Brown, 1930)
 Nyholmia drymophila (Young & Stribling, 1990)
 Nyholmia okiensis Yoshitomi & Hayashi, 2016

References

Further reading

 

Scirtoidea
Articles created by Qbugbot